Richard Hanley is a Zambian-born Australian philosopher.

Life
Richard Hanley, also known as "Hypertime Hanley" was born in Zambia and later moved to Australia as a small child. He studied at the University of Sydney, and completed his PhD at University of Maryland. He is now an associate professor of philosophy at the University of Delaware. Philosophically, he is a perdurantist following in the footsteps of David Lewis. Hanley believes that time travel is logically, physically, and epistemically possible.

Writings

Hanley coauthored the Blackwell Guide to the Philosophy of Language

He has written on philosophy in fiction. He is the author of the book, Is Data Human? The Metaphysics of Star Trek, which explores a number of philosophical questions raised by various episodes of Star Trek: The Next Generation, Star Trek: Deep Space Nine, and Star Trek: Voyager, such as whether Data is human, and whether a character called Tuvix, temporarily formed by the characters Tuvok and Neelix being beamed into a single body, was a separate being entitled to its own existence.

While the title of the book was changed to Is Data Human? The Metaphysics of Star Trek for the paperback version, the original hardcover version of the same book was simply entitled, The Metaphysics of Star Trek.

Hanley is frequently critical of the Star Trek writers' sophistication in treating philosophical issues, but nevertheless praises Star Trek for its willingness, rare among TV shows, to frequently raise questions of philosophical significance. According to WorldCat, the book is held in almost 800 libraries.

He is also the editor of South Park and Philosophy: Bigger, Longer, and More Penetrating, released 28 March 2007.

See also

References

External links 
 Richard Hanely's website
 

Year of birth missing (living people)
Living people
Zambian people of British descent
University of Maryland, College Park alumni
American philosophy academics
University of Delaware faculty
University of Sydney alumni
Zambian emigrants to Australia
Australian emigrants to the United States
Zambian writers
Place of birth missing (living people)
21st-century Zambian writers